Tepidibacillus infernus is an aerotolerant anaerobic, organotrophic, spore-forming and moderately thermophilic bacterium from the genus of Tepidibacillus which has been isolated from microbial mat from the TauTona Gold Mine in South Africa.

References

External links 
Type strain of Tepidibacillus infernus at BacDive -  the Bacterial Diversity Metadatabase
 

Bacillaceae
Bacteria described in 2016